Qais Farooq (born 31 August 1978) is an Emirati cricketer. He made his first-class debut for the United Arab Emirates against Hong Kong in the 2015–17 ICC Intercontinental Cup tournament on 11 November 2015.

References

External links
 

1978 births
Living people
Emirati cricketers
Place of birth missing (living people)